Kollóttadyngja is a shield volcano in the Ódáðahraun lava-field in Iceland. Its height reaches 1,177 metres, and it has a diameter of 6–7 km. The summit crater is 800 metres in diameter, but only about 20–30 metres deep. In its centre, there is a bowl about 150 metres in diameter with a depth of about 60–70 metres.

See also
 Fjords of Iceland
 Geography of Iceland
 Glaciers of Iceland
 Iceland plume
 List of lakes of Iceland
 List of islands off Iceland
 List of volcanoes in Iceland
 List of rivers of Iceland
 Volcanism of Iceland
 Waterfalls of Iceland

References 

Mountains of Iceland
Volcanoes of Iceland
North Volcanic Zone of Iceland
One-thousanders of Iceland
Shield volcanoes